Andy Razaf (born Andriamanantena Paul Razafinkarefo; December 16, 1895 – February 3, 1973) was an American poet, composer, and lyricist of such well-known songs as "Ain't Misbehavin'" and "Honeysuckle Rose".

Biography
Razaf was born in Washington, D.C., United States. His birth name was Andriamanantena Paul Razafinkarefo. He was the son of Henri Razafinkarefo, nephew of Queen Ranavalona III of the Imerina kingdom in Madagascar, and Jennie Razafinkarefo (née Waller), the daughter of John L. Waller, the first African American consul to Imerina. The French invasion of Madagascar (1894-95) left his father dead, and forced his pregnant 15-year-old mother to escape to the United States, where he was born in 1895. 

He was raised in Harlem, Manhattan, and at the age of 16 he quit school and took a job as an elevator operator at a Tin Pan Alley office building. A year later he penned his first song text, embarking on his career as a lyricist. During this time he would spend many nights in the Greyhound Lines bus station in Times Square, and would pick up his mail at the Gaiety Theatre office building, which was considered the black Tin Pan Alley.

Some of Razaf's early poems were published in 1917–18 in the Hubert Harrison-edited Voice, the first newspaper of the "New Negro Movement". Razaf collaborated with composers Eubie Blake, Don Redman, James P. Johnson, Harry Brooks, and Fats Waller. Among the best-known Razaf-Waller collaborations are "Ain't Misbehavin'", "Honeysuckle Rose", "The Joint Is Jumpin'", "Willow Tree", "Keepin' Out of Mischief Now" and "(What Did I Do to Be So) Black and Blue". His music was played by other Tin Pan Alley musicians, as well as Benny Goodman, Eubie Blake, Cab Calloway and many others. He was a contributor and editor of the Universal Negro Improvement Association and African Communities League's Negro World newspaper.

He also wrote quite a number of raunchy 'character' blues-type songs for many of the women blues singers of the 1920s.  He also made a number of records as vocalist (both as solo and as vocalist for jazz groups, including a handful by James P. Johnson and Fletcher Henderson).

He was married to Jean Blackwell Hutson from 1939 to 1947.

In 1972, Razaf was recognized by his Tin Pan Alley peers in the Songwriters Hall of Fame.

Death
Razaf died in North Hollywood, California from renal failure, aged 77.

Songs
The Songwriters Hall of Fame entry for Andy Razaf lists 215 compositions, giving co-writers and publishers. He had many unpublished songs; Singer's biography lists more than 800, published and unpublished (but without giving lyrics). Some notable lyrics include:
 "Baltimo", composed at the age of 17, was sung by members of The Passing Show of 1913 at the Winter Garden, New York.
 "Mound Bayou", named for Mound Bayou an independent Black community in Mississippi, the original song was sung by Maxine Sullivan, and was on an album dedicated to his work, A Tribute to Andy Razaf.
 "Ain't Misbehavin'"
 "Black and Blue"
 "Garvey! Hats Off to Garvey"
 "Gee, Baby, Ain't I Good to You" with Don Redman (1929)
 "Honeysuckle Rose"
 "In the Mood"
 "A Porter’s Love Song to a Chambermaid"
 "The Joint Is Jumpin'"
 "Keepin' Out of Mischief Now"
 "Louisiana"
 "Stompin' at the Savoy"
 "That's What I Like About the South"
 "UNIA"

Recordings
Although Razaf's songs are found on hundreds of recordings, there are only two albums devoted exclusively to his compositions:
 Maxine Sullivan, A Tribute to Andy Razaf, 1956, produced by Leonard Feather,> re-issued in 2006 as My Memories of You with two additional non-Razaf tracks.
 Bobby Short, Guess Who's in Town: Bobby Short Performs the Songs of Andy Razaf, 1987, re-released in 2001 in tandem with Bobby Short Loves Cole Porter.

Poems
 Wired, Hired, Fired, an expression of grief and sorrow that color bars one fitted to position (that is, one otherwise qualified for, or well suited to the job, is barred on the basis of race).
 Jack Johnson, touching on defeat with honor.

References

Bibliography
 Black and Blue: The Life and Lyrics of Andy Razaf by Barry Singer, Foreword by Bobby Short, 
 Easy to Remember: The Great American Songwriters and Their Songs'; by William Zinsser, David R. Godine Publisher, 2006, 
 The Poets of Tin Pan Alley: A History of America's Great Lyricists by Philip Furia, 
 Who's Who of the Colored Race, Memento Edition Half-Century Anniversary of Negro Freedom in U.S.'', reprinted by Gale Research Company, Book Tower Detroit, 1976.

External links
 
FBI file on Andy Razaf at the Internet Archive
Andy Razaf recordings at the Discography of American Historical Recordings.

1895 births
1973 deaths
African-American musicians
American people of Malagasy descent
Burials at Angelus-Rosedale Cemetery
Deaths from cancer in California
Musicians from Washington, D.C.
Musicians from New York City
People from Harlem
Universal Negro Improvement Association and African Communities League members
20th-century American musicians